Phalaenopsis pulcherrima is a species of orchid found from Hainan Island to western Malesia.

Pollination
Pollination through bees, specifically Amegilla nigritar, has been recorded in China. This species employs a deceptive pollination strategy. The orchid does not provide rewards to pollinators. It benefits from blooming in the same period as rewarding species. Amegilla is the most important pollinator, but other diurnal insects, such as four species of bees, two species of butterflies, one species of moth and two other unidentified insects, have also been observed to interact with the flowers.

References

External links
 
 

pulcherrima
Lithophytic orchids
Epiphytic orchids
Orchids of Borneo
Orchids of Myanmar
Orchids of India
Orchids of Indonesia
Orchids of Cambodia
Orchids of China
Orchids of Laos
Orchids of Vietnam
Orchids of Malaysia
Orchids of Thailand